Geraeus is a genus of weevils in the family Curculionidae (true weevils). There are over 100 species in the genus. Some of the more familiar species include Geraeus dilectus, Geraeus euryonyx, and Geraeus picumnus.

References

External links
 
 Geraeus at Bugguide.net

Baridinae genera
Taxa named by Francis Polkinghorne Pascoe